Svartån is the name of several rivers and streams in Sweden and Finland.

Sweden 
Svartån, Västmanland, river in Västmanland which flows through Skultuna and Västerås to lake Mälaren.
 Svartån, Östergötland, river in Småland and Östergötland which flows from Aneby through Tranås, lake Sommen and Mjölby to lake Roxen, where it joins Motala ström.
Svartån, Närke, river in Närke which flows through Örebro to lake Hjälmaren.
Svartån, Skåne, river in Skåne which flows from lake Krageholmssjön to the Baltic Sea at Svarte.
Svartån, Halland, river in Halland and a tributary to Högvadsån.
In Värmland there are two streams named Svartån:
Svartån (Grässjön) from lake Bosjön near Filipstad to Grässjön south of Hagfors
Svartån (Ölman), a 20 km long tributary to Ölman in the southern part of the province.
In Gästrikland and Hälsingland there are four different streams named Svartån.

Finland 
Svartån is the Swedish name of a stream in Nyland/Uusimaa in Finland. Its Finnish name is Karjaanjoki.